The British Independent Film Award for Best Supporting Actor is an annual award given by the British Independent Film Awards (BIFA) to recognize the best supporting performance by an actor in a British independent film. 

From 2003 to 2007, only one award was presented for supporting performances named Best Supporting Actor/Actress. Since 2008, two categories named Best Supporting Actor and Best Supporting Actress are presented.

Actors Eddie Marsan and Sean Harris are the most nominated actors in this category since its creation in 2008 with three nominations each.

On July 2022, it was announced that the performance categories would be replaced with gender-neutral categories, with both Best Supporting Actor and Best Supporting Actress merging into the Best Lead Performance category. Additionally, a category named Best Joint Lead Performance was created for "two (or exceptionally three) performances that are the joint focus of the film, especially where performances share a large number of scenes and screen time".

Winners and nominees

2000s
 Best Supporting Actor/Actress

 Best Supporting Actor

2010s

2020s

Multiple nominations

3 nominations
 Eddie Marsan
 Sean Harris

2 nominations
 Domhnall Gleeson
 Ralph Fiennes
 Michael Fassbender
 Steve Buscemi
 Barry Keoghan

See also
 Academy Award for Best Supporting Actor
 BAFTA Award for Best Actor in a Supporting Role
 Critics' Choice Movie Award for Best Supporting Actor
 Golden Globe Award for Best Supporting Actor – Motion Picture
 Screen Actors Guild Award for Outstanding Performance by a Male Actor in a Supporting Role

References

External links
 Official website

British Independent Film Awards